Jane Aamund (8 November 1936 – 29 January 2019) was a Danish author and journalist. Her breakthrough in Denmark came with the Klinkevals trilogy.

Works
Aamund's works include:

  (English: The two penny dance) – 1989  
 Juliane Jensen – 1990
 Oven vande (English: Afloat) – 1992
Bag damen stod en Christian (English Behind the lady stood a Christian) – 1994
Colorado drømme (English: Colorado dreams) – 1997
Danskernes lille verden (English: The small world of the Danes) – 1997
Den grønne port (English: The green gate) – 1998
Kamæleonen (English: The Chameleon) – 1999
Den hvide verden (English: The white world) – 2000
 (English: West of moon) – 2002
Den irske stemme (English: The Irish voice) – 2003
Udlængsel (English: Wanderlust) – 2004
De grønne skove (English: The green forests) – 2008
Smeltediglen (English: The crucible) – 2009
Dengang det var sjovt (English: Back when it was fun) – 2010
Øjebliksbilleder (English: Snapshots) – 2010
Vindue uden udsigt (English: Window without a view) – 2011
Samtaler om natten - 2018
Bjergsted drømme - 2019

About Jane Aamund 

Kærlighed og smerte (English: Love and pain) – 1997. TV documentary about Jane Aamund.
Med kærlig hilsen (English: With love) – 1999 – TV documentary about Jane Aamund.
Lys i livet (English: Light in the life) – 2005. Book with interviews by Cecilie Frøkjær.
Passionen - Ninka interviewer Jane Aamund - 1997. Book with interviews by Anne Wolden-Ræthinge.

Recognition 
Aamund won multiple awards:

 Den Berlingske Fonds Journalistpris (English: The Berlingske Foundation Journalist Award) in 1997
 Bog & Idé-prisen (Danskernes Yndlingsforfatter) in 1997, 1998, 1999 and 2004
De Gyldne Laurbær in 1998 for Colorado drømme

References 

1936 births
2019 deaths
People from Frederiksberg
Danish women novelists
Danish women journalists
20th-century Danish novelists
20th-century Danish journalists
20th-century Danish women writers
21st-century Danish novelists
21st-century Danish journalists
21st-century Danish women writers